Union des femmes pour la défense de Paris et les soins aux blessés was a women's group during the 1871 Paris Commune. The union organized working women, ensured a market and fair pay for their work, and participated in the defence of Paris against the troops of the Third Republic, particularly at Place Blanche.

History 
It was founded by Elisabeth Dmitrieff on 11 April 1871 in the Larched room (79 Temple Road) in the 10th arrondissement, Dmitrieff, who had been sent to Paris from London by Karl Marx as a representative of the First International, was a member of the central committee and remained general secretary of the Union's executive committee, the only non-elected and non-revocable post of the organization. The executive committee was made of seven members. About 130 served in the union's central committee. Actual membership is estimated as being a thousand or more.

In April 1871, the group issued a call to Parisian women to form committees in each arrondissement for a collaborative women's movement in Paris's defense. 

In early May, the women's union issued a manifesto calling equal treatment of gender, in line with the Commune's annulment of privileges and inequalities. The union also petitioned the Commune's economic director, Léo Frankel, for work for women. He recommended organizing workshops for women to work at home, to be designed by the women's union. The group investigated the needs of unemployed women and created cooperative workshops. It did not designate roles based on trades but centralized the distribution of orders for women to complete and return to the workshop for delivery. This system differed from the piece-work originally proposed by Commune officials, which would have preserved the order of women staying at home and previous style of labor. The union, instead, organized free producer associations to share out communal profits. They supported variety within trade work, elimination of gendered competition, reduced work hours, and equal pay for equal work.

The Commune's Committee of Public Safety had outlawed women on the battlefield on May 1, but the Union remained committed to its militancy. When a widely published statement attributed to "the women of Paris" appeared later in May, calling for "peace at any price", the Union responded with a manifesto that asserted, "it is not peace, but all-out war that the working women of Paris claim! Today conciliation would be treason! ...  The women of Paris will prove to France and to the world that they will also know, at the moment of supreme danger—on the barricades, on the ramparts of Paris, if the reactionaries force the gates—to give as their brothers their blood and their life for the defense and triumph of the Commune, that is to say the people!"

Known members

Executive committee 

 Elisabeth Dmitrieff, general secretary
 Nathalie Lemel
 Aline Jacquier
 Blanche Lefebvre
 Marie Leloup
 Aglaë Jarry
 Madame Collin
 Adèle Gauvain (or Gauvin)

Committee leaders by arrondissement 

 Anne Maillet, seamstress
 (none)
 Marquant, mechanic 
 Angelina Sabatier, hatter
 Victorine Pievaux, chamareuse 
 Nathalie Lemel, bookbinder
 Octavie Vataire, laundress (lingère)
 Marie Picot, unknown
 Bessaiche, seamstress
 Blanche Lefebvre, laundress (blanchisseuse)
 Marie Leloup, seamstress 
 Foret, seamstress
 Chantraile, no profession
 Rivière, waistcoat-maker (giletière)
 (none)
 Aline Jacquier, waistcoat-maker (giletière)
 Aglaë Jarry, no profession
 Blondeau, gold-polisher
 Jeanne Musset, seamstress
 Adèle Gauvain, cardboard-maker (cartonnière)

Other members 
 Adélaïde Valentin, delegate to the Central Provisional Committee
 Marie Chiffon, ambulance nurse
 Octavie Tardiff, member
 Victorine Gorget, member
 Noémie Colleville, Sophie Graix, Joséphine Prat, Céline Delvainquier, Aimée Delvainquier

References

Bibliography

Further reading 

 

Women's organizations based in France
Paris Commune
Organizations established in 1871
Women in Paris